Leroy Sutton (September 12, 1920 – May, 1984) was an American Negro league pitcher in the 1940s.

A native of Cairo, Illinois, Sutton made his Negro leagues debut in 1940 with the St. Louis–New Orleans Stars. He returned to the Stars the following season, then spent three seasons with the Chicago American Giants, and finished his career in 1945 with the Cincinnati Clowns. Sutton died in Hallsboro, North Carolina in 1984 at age 63.

References

External links
 and Seamheads

1920 births
1984 deaths
Date of death missing
Chicago American Giants players
St. Louis–New Orleans Stars players
People from Cairo, Illinois
Baseball players from Illinois
Baseball pitchers
20th-century African-American sportspeople